

The Caproni Ca.132 was a prototype for a large aircraft built in Italy in 1934, intended for use as either a bomber or airliner. It was a conventional low-wing cantilever monoplane, powered by a radial engine on each wing and in the nose. The main undercarriage was housed within large streamlined spats. Configured as an airliner, it would have seated 20 passengers.

Operators

Regia Aeronautica for evaluation only.

Specifications (as bomber)

References

 
 Уголок неба

Ca.132
1930s Italian bomber aircraft
1930s Italian airliners
Trimotors
Low-wing aircraft
Aircraft first flown in 1934